"Rain" is a song by American rock band Breaking Benjamin. It was released in June 2005 as the third single from their second album, We Are Not Alone.

The 2005 single version of "Rain" is found only on newer pressings of We Are Not Alone. This version is a full-band version of "Rain" (as opposed to the original version in which the only instrument used is an acoustic guitar). The song was performed on Sessions@AOL along with "So Cold" and "Sooner or Later".

Track listing

Personnel
Album version
Produced and mixed by David Bendeth
Engineering and digital editing by Dan Korneff
Assisted by John Bender
Recorded and mixed at Mirror Image (Studio D)

2005 version
Produced by David Bendeth
Engineering by Dan Korneff
Digital editing by John Bender
Recorded at Paragon Studios, Nashville, Tennessee
Mixed by Michael Brauer at Quad Studios, New York City
Assisted by Keith Gary and Will Hensley

Charts

References

2005 singles
Breaking Benjamin songs
Hollywood Records singles
Songs written by Billy Corgan
Songs written by Benjamin Burnley
2004 songs
American alternative rock songs